Cornelius Chi-Dubem Udebuluzor (born 27 August 1974)  is a Nigerian football player. He started his career on Górnik Zabrze Polish club. He represented Hong Kong League XI in various friendly matches, including the Carlsberg Cup.  In 2001, he helped Hong Kong XI beating Paraguay at the Carlsberg Cup.  The following year, he again represented Hong Kong XI in the Carlsberg Cup and then a pre-World Cup 2002 tournament held in Hong Kong against Scotland.  In 2002–2003, he also won Hong Kong FA Cup with Sun Hei, as well as the League Cup final. In the league they finished runners-up, one point behind the champions. Was the second best league scorer with 16 goals in 2002–2003.

His son Michael currently plays for FC Ingolstadt under-19s team.

Club career
 1996 Jasper United FC (Onitsha) (Nigeria)
 1996-97 Górnik Zabrze (Poland)
 1997-98 Ionikos F.C. (Greece)
 1998-99 Ionikos F.C. (Greece)
 1999-00 Ionikos F.C. (Greece)
 2000-01 Proodeftiki F.C. (Greece)
 2000-01 Sun Hei (Hong Kong)
 2001-02 Buler Rangers (Hong Kong)
 2002-03 Sun Hei (Hong Kong)
 2003-04 Buler Rangers (Hong Kong)

References

 
 Profile

1974 births
Living people
Nigerian footballers
Nigerian expatriate footballers
Association football forwards
Górnik Zabrze players
Hong Kong First Division League players
Expatriate footballers in Hong Kong
Sun Hei SC players
Hong Kong Rangers FC players
Ionikos F.C. players
Proodeftiki F.C. players
Nigerian expatriate sportspeople in Hong Kong
Expatriate footballers in Poland
Nigerian expatriate sportspeople in Poland
Hong Kong League XI representative players
Jasper United F.C. players